Festuca cretacea is a species of grass in the family Poaceae. This species is native to Central European Russia, South European Russia, and Ukraine. Festuca cretacea prefers temperate biomes and is perennial. This species was first described in 1927.

References

cretacea